Karsten Stehen Sørensen (born February 1, 1948) is a former Danish handball player who competed in the 1972 Summer Olympics.

He played his club handball with Aarhus KFUM. In 1972 he was part of the Denmark men's national handball team which finished thirteenth in the 1972 Olympic tournament. He played two matches and scored five goals.

References

1948 births
Living people
Danish male handball players
Olympic handball players of Denmark
Handball players at the 1972 Summer Olympics
Sportspeople from Aarhus